The 1928 Irish local elections were held in all the counties, cities and towns of the Irish Free State in June and July 1928, under the Local Elections Act, 1927. These were the first local elections contested by Fianna Fáil.

Results

Detailed results by council type

County councils

References

See also 
Local government in the Republic of Ireland

Local elections
1928 elections in Europe
1928
Local